Théophile Nkounkou (born 7 January 1952) is a Congolese sprinter. He competed in the men's 100 metres at the 1980 Summer Olympics. Nkounkou ran in heat 8 coming 3rd out of 7 runners with a time of 10.53 seconds, advancing to the quarterfinals. In the quarterfinals he was placed race 3 a came 6th out of 8 runners with a time of 10.59 seconds, he didn't advance to the semi-finals. Nkounkou also competed at the 1972 Summer Olympics in Munich, West Germany in the men's 4x100m relay. He raced along with Antoine Nkounkou, Louis Knanza and Jean-Pierre Bassegela. They raced in heat 4 and came 4th out of 8 teams with a time of 39.86 seconds. They advanced to the semi-finals and came 8th out of 8 runners in their race with a time of 39.97 seconds. They did not advance to the finals. 

Nkounkou's personal best in the 100m is 10.28 seconds set on 8 September 1979 in Mexico City.

References

1952 births
Living people
Athletes (track and field) at the 1972 Summer Olympics
Athletes (track and field) at the 1980 Summer Olympics
Athletes (track and field) at the 1984 Summer Olympics
Republic of the Congo male sprinters
Olympic athletes of the Republic of the Congo
World Athletics Championships athletes for the Republic of the Congo
Place of birth missing (living people)